Bisantrene, trademarked as Zantrene, is an anthracenyl bishydrazone with anthracycline-like antineoplastic activity. Bisantrene intercalates with and disrupts the configuration of DNA, resulting in DNA single-strand breaks, DNA-protein crosslinking, and inhibition of DNA replication. This agent is similar to doxorubicin in activity, but unlike anthracyclines like doxorubicin, exhibits little cardiotoxicity.

Bisantrene has recently been identified a potent (IC50 142nM) Fat Mass and Obesity (FTO) associated protein a m6A RNA demethylase.

Bisantrene is currently undergoing a number of Phase II trials to assess the efficacy of fighting hard to target cancers and understand any negative side effects that could occur.

Medical uses 
Clinical trials of Bisantrene in the 1980s showed efficacy in a range of leukaemias (including Acute Myeloid Leukaemia), breast cancer, and ovarian cancer.

Side effects 
High doses of bisantrene (above 200 mg/m2/day) cause side effects typical of anthracycline chemotherapeutics. Common side effects include hair loss, bone marrow suppression, vomiting, rash, and inflammation of the mouth.

Unlike other anthracycline chemotherapeutics, Bisantrene shows low levels of cardiotoxicity. In a Phase III metastatic breast cancer clinical, patients were exposed to cumulative doses in excess of 5440 mg/m2 without developing cardiac damage. The same study observed significantly lower rates of hair loss and nausea compared to patients given doxorubicin.

Mechanism of action 
Bisantrene contains an appropriately sized planar electron-rich chromophore to be a DNA intercalating agent, and in vitro, it is a potent inhibitor of DNA and RNA synthesis.

History 
Bisantrene was developed by Lederle Laboratories during the 1970s, a subsidiary of American Cyanamid, as a less cardiotoxic alternative to anthracyclines. Across the 1980s and early 1990s, over 40 clinical trials were conducted using Bisantrene. The National Cancer Institute (NCI) undertook a large scale trial using Bisantrene under the name "Orange Crush", including a range of preclinical trials which found bisantrene to be inactive when taken orally, though was found to be efficacy towards some cancer cells intravenous, intraperitoneal, or subcutaneous.

In the 1980s, forty-four patients with metastatic breast cancer who had undergone extensive combination chemotherapy with doxorubicin and had failed to respond to the combination, were treated with bisantrene. From 40 patients that were evaluated, 9 showed a partial response, and 18 showed the cancer was not progressive but stabilised.

Bisantrene was approved for human medical use in France in 1990 to target Acute Myeloid Leukemia (AML) cancers.

It has undergone 46 Phase II trials with 1,800 patients to test its efficacy against fighting cancer cells.

The drug was delisted in the early 1990s due to a series of pharmaceutical mergers and acquisitions.

Currently patents are held by Race Oncology Limited and further Phase II and Phase III trials are being initiated to assess its efficacy as a targeted oncology cancer treatment.

Society and culture

Names 
Its chemical name is 9, 10-antrhracenedicarboxaldehydebis [(4, 5-dihydro-1H-imidazole-2-yl) hydrazine] dihydrochloride. Bisantrene was given the nickname “Orange Crush” in the 1980s due to its fluorescent orange color when in solution.

Race Oncology Ltd are reviving Bisantrene in new clinical trials and have trademarked it for use under Zantrene.

Bisantrene is also referred to as CS1 in cancer research journals.

Research 
In 1990 bisantrene was examined to understand the various cardiac oxygen metabolism effects against other anthracycline antibiotics. It was found that it did not significantly enhance cardiac reactive oxygen metabolism and therefore, was not a cause of hydrogen peroxide by heart sarcosomes and submitochondrial particles compared to other anthracycline antibiotics.

In 1990, the drug was tested on fresh clonogenic leukemia patients in a sample size of 15. Bisantrene proved effective in 12 out of 15 acute non lymphoid leukemias (ANLL) cases, inhibiting blast colony growth in a dose-dependent, time-dependent way. Three cases were unresponsive both in vitro and in vivo.

In May 2020, Sheba Medical Centre initiated a Phase II clinical trial with relapsed or refractory Acute Myeloid Leukaemia participants who had failed three prior rounds of treatment with other cancer fighting drugs. Bisantrene was found to be well tolerated with only a single round of treatment and had an overall clinical response rate of 40% (n=10).

In June 2020, City of Hope National Medical Center identified Bisantrene as a potent small molecule that suppressed tumour growth in multiple cancers when other treatments were not effective.

George Clinical is currently scoping a proof-of-concept Phase I/II breast cancer clinical trial in combination with cyclophosphamide.

In June 2022, preclinical studies were completed to identify the resistance of melanoma cells to bisantrene in combination with BRAF and MEK protein kinase inhibitors. The study found to improve the killing of human melanoma cells and to better target melanoma in organoid and animal tumour models. Previous research into the killing of melanoma cells using bisantrene as a single agent found it was high effective at killing a diverse range of melanoma cell subtypes, showing an association between FTO expression levels and melanoma cell sensitivity. 

Race Oncology in conjunction with the University of Newcastle discovered in a preclinical study that Bisantrene not only helped fight cancer cells, but also protected human heart muscle cells from anthracycline-induced chemotherapy death. Anthracyclines are current standard of care when treating cancer, but have serious adverse impacts on the heart when used. Further to this, in a Phase 1 study released in June 2022 using mouse models, bisantrene was found to not only help fight cancer cells, but also protected the heart muscle when used in conjunction with cancer treatment standard of care. Even when the chemotherapeutic dose of doxorubicin was increased without significant additional toxicity or bone marrow suppression. 

Race Oncology has received positive feedback and guidance from the US FDA regarding Zantrene and its clinical plans. FDA has indicated the clinical hold issues raised with Race’s previous IND submitted in 2019 have been satisfactorily addressed. FDA guidance provides a viable path for the clinical advancement of
Zantrene in the US.

Race researchers have developed an improved & novel formulation of Zantrene that enables peripheral intravenous (IV) delivery, expanding potential market
Societal (San Diego, USA) has been contracted to manufacture the new GMP drug product formulation with expected delivery date of late Q2 CY 2023.
This new Zantrene IV formulation (codename RC220) provides Race with additional IP patent protection for Zantrene, valid to 2043.

References 

Anthracenes
Hydrazones
Imidazoles